Aas Ka Panchhi is a 1961 Hindi movie produced by J. Om Prakash. It was written by Mohan Kumar and Rajinder Singh Bedi and directed by Mohan Kumar.

The film stars Rajendra Kumar, Vyjayanthimala and Leela Chitnis. The film's music was by Shankar Jaikishan.

Story 
Rajan Khanna lives in a family of four including his father, mother and a younger sister. He is involved with his college mate Neena Bakshi. After graduation, he wants to join the military, but his father wants him to join the same office where he worked for many years. In the heat of the argument, father gets a heart attack and to make him happy Rajan joins the office. After a while, his father passes away and Rajan joins the army. Later, when he returns, nothing is the same anymore. Neena is engaged to doctor Ramesh.To avoid his misery Rajan, goes back to the military base and takes up a mission to rescue a senior officer Major Bakshi . He is behind enemy lines. Will he return alive? Will he get his love back??

Cast 
Vyjayanthimala as Neena Bakshi
Rajendra Kumar as Rajan 'Raju' Khanna
Raj Mehra as Major Surendra Bakshi
Sunder	as Mangal
Nazir Hussain as Nihalchand Khanna
Shaminder as Ramesh
Mumtaz Begum as Mrs. Girdhari
Shivraj as Girdhari
Leela Chitnis as Mrs. Nihalchand Khanna
Brahm Bhardwaj	as Army Officer

Soundtrack

External links 
 

1961 films
1960s Hindi-language films
Films scored by Shankar–Jaikishan
Films directed by Mohan Kumar